MYU, Myu or Myū can refer to:

Myū Azama
Doctor Myū, a character in Dragon Ball GT
Miyagi University
 Myu - A singer and composer, member of Kukui (band)
 The Greek letter mu (Μ or μ)
 MYU - A current member of LinQ

See also
 Mew (disambiguation)